Priyah is a reconstructed Indo European Love Goddess.

Background 
It is ancestral to Sanskrit priya "dear, beloved" and common Germanic Frijjō.

, is reconstructed as “beloved, friend”, the god(dess) of the garden. She is known in Hittite as the object of the Purulli festival, in Sanskrit as Parvati. 

In Greek she is recognized as Aphrodite, although this name does not quite fit the expected phonology, and apparently means the “goddess of the garden”, related word “paradise.” In Latin Venus takes her place (not cognate at all), and in Old Norse she is Freya. She is possibly worshipped under the name Perun in southern Slavic-speaking areas. In Albanian she is Perendi, Christianized as St. Prendi. J. Grimm refers to an Old Bohemian form Priye, used as a gloss for Aphrodite. Many of these goddesses give their name to the fifth day of the week, Friday.  They are also very well known in lesser form such as the Germanic Elves and the Persian Peris, charming and seductive beings in folklore.  

There are also masculine forms of this deity, Sanskrit Prajapati, Greek Priapos, borrowed into Latin as Priapus, and Old Norse Freyr.

In Avestan, she is demonized as Paurwa, but replaced by Anahita. Possibly due to the efforts of Zarathustra. However, Priyah was eventually reintegrated into Zoroastrianism as Parendi, and a hymn called Yasht was created to praise her. In later Persian folklore, she was depicted as the Peris, small spirits known for their alluring beauty. 

One of the names for Priyah in old Slavic sources is Priye, but there is limited information about her in ancient records. She was given a replacement name and christianized as Paraskeva Friday, yet despite objections from church authorities, women continue to worship her on Fridays with dancing and votive offerings.

One of the prominent elements linked to Priyah are various myths, among which the most famous involves her necklace of beauty being stolen or borrowed and subsequently returned. Depending on what is more treasured in each region, different kinds of jewels such as pearls, amber, and gold beads are regarded as her tears. Her most significant celebrations are connected to fruit trees, and typically occur around the time of their blooming in the spring, with May 1st being the general date, although the exact timing varies across cultures.

See also 
 Paraskeva Friday

References 

Proto-Indo-European deities
Reconstructed words
Proto-Indo-European mythology
Love and lust deities